Bruschini is an Italian surname.  Notable people with the surname include:

 Angelo Bruschini, English rock guitarist
 Laura Bruschini (born 1966), Italian beach volleyball player
 Massimo Bruschini (1942-1979), Italian boxer

Italian-language surnames

it:Bruschini